Doug Harris may refer to:

 Doug Harris (athlete) (1919–1996), New Zealand runner
 Doug Harris (cricketer) (born 1962), Australian cricketer
 Doug Harris (Neighbours), a fictional character on Australian soap opera Neighbours
 Douglas Harris (field hockey) (born 1966), Canadian former field hockey player

See also 
 Douglas Emhoff (born 1964), American attorney, second gentleman of the United States